Robert Edwin Rumsey (17 February 1844 – 12 June 1884) was an English professional cricketer who played in three first-class cricket matches in 1875.

Rumsey was born at Greenwich, then in Kent, in 1875 the son of Robert and Phoebe Rumsey. His father was an engineer working at John Penn and Sons in Deptford. Robert joined the same company and spent his working life as a pattern maker. He captained the company cricket team and by the 1870s was supplementing his income by working as a coach, first at Southgate and later at Gore Court in Sittingbourne.

Rumsey played in Colts matches for Kent sides in 1874 and made his senior debut for Kent County Cricket Club against Hampshire at Catford in 1875, taking a five-wicket haul on debut. He made two further first-class appearances for Kent in the same season, against Derbyshire and Surrey, taking a further two wickets. Rumsey continued to play club cricket, including for a Players of Kent XI in 1876, and appeared at least twice for the United South of England Eleven.

Rumsey married Emily Malyon in 1866; the couple had two children. He died after an illness in 1884 at Greenwich aged 40.

References

External links

1844 births
1884 deaths
People from Greenwich
English cricketers
Kent cricketers